Sabazios Glacier is the  long and  wide glacier on the east side of northern Sentinel Range in Ellsworth Mountains, Antarctica.  It is situated south of Newcomer Glacier, west of Anchialus Glacier, north of Embree Glacier, and east of Zhenda Glacier and Skaklya Glacier.  The glacier drains the east slopes of Mount Alf and Mount Sharp, and the north slopes of the side ridge that trends 9.15 km from Mount Dalrymple on the main crest of Sentinel Range east-northeast to Robinson Pass, flows northwards and joins Newcomer Glacier northwest of Mount Lanning in Sostra Heights.

The glacier is named after the Thracian god Sabazios.

Location
US mapping in 1961.

Tributary Glaciers
 Zhenda Glacier
 Skaklya Glacier

See also
 List of glaciers in the Antarctic
 Glaciology

Maps
 Newcomer Glacier.  Scale 1:250 000 topographic map.  Reston, Virginia: US Geological Survey, 1961.
 Antarctic Digital Database (ADD). Scale 1:250000 topographic map of Antarctica. Scientific Committee on Antarctic Research (SCAR). Since 1993, regularly updated.

References
 Sabazios Glacier SCAR Composite Gazetteer of Antarctica
 Bulgarian Antarctic Gazetteer. Antarctic Place-names Commission. (details in Bulgarian, basic data in English)

External links
 Sabazios Glacier. Copernix satellite image

Glaciers of Ellsworth Land
Bulgaria and the Antarctic